Edward D. Miller Jr. was the Frances Watt Baker, M.D. and Lenox D. Baker Jr., M.D. Dean of the Medical Faculty at Johns Hopkins University and the Chief Executive Officer of Johns Hopkins Medicine from 1997 to 2012.
 
He is an anesthesiologist who has published over 150 scientific papers and other works on  cardiovascular effects of anesthetic drugs and vascular smooth muscle relaxation.

Biography
Miller was born in 1943 in Rochester, N.Y., received an A.B. from Ohio Wesleyan University and an M.D. from the University of Rochester School of Medicine and Dentistry. He was then intern at University Hospital in Boston, chief resident in anesthesiology at Peter Bent Brigham Hospital in Boston, and research fellow in physiology at Harvard Medical School.  He became a member of the faculty at the University of Virginia, then professor and chairman of the Department of Anesthesiology at the College of Physicians and Surgeons of Columbia University He became professor and director of the Department of Anesthesiology and Critical Care Medicine at Johns Hopkins in 1994, and was appointed interim dean in 1996.  He was succeeded in 2012 by Dr. Paul B. Rothman.

Honors
 President of the Association of University Anesthesiologists
 Editor of  Anesthesia and Analgesia
 Editor of Critical Care Medicine
 Board of the International Anesthesia Research Society
 Chairman of the FDA's Advisory Committee on Anesthesia and Life Support Drugs
 Member of the Institute of Medicine of the National Academy of Sciences
 Fellow of the Royal College of Physicians 
 Fellow of the Royal College of Anaesthetists
Distinguished Eagle Scout

References

1943 births
Living people
Ohio Wesleyan University alumni
University of Rochester alumni
Harvard Medical School people
University of Virginia School of Medicine faculty
Columbia University faculty
Johns Hopkins University faculty
Fellows of the Royal College of Physicians
American_anesthesiologists
Members_of_the_National_Academy_of_Medicine